Schistonchus is a genus of plant-parasitic nematodes in the family Aphelenchoididae.

Schistonchus laevigatus and Schistonchus aureus are plant-parasitic nematodes associated with the pollinator Pegoscapus assuetus and Pegoscapus mexicanus respectively and syconia of  Ficus citrifolia and Ficus aurea respectively.

Schistonchus caprifici is a nematode associated with the fig pollinator Blastophaga psenes, and its cleptoparasite Philotrypesis caricae.

Schistonchus macrophylla and Schistonchus altermacrophylla are associated with the pollinator Pleistodontes froggatti of Ficus macrophylla.

References

External links 

 PESI

Aphelenchoididae
Secernentea genera